In Greek mythology, Talaus  was the king of Argos and one of the Argonauts. He was the son of Bias (or Perialces) and Pero. His wife was Lysimache, daughter of Abas (also known as Eurynome, Lysippe or Lysianassa, daughter of Polybus). He was the father of Adrastus, Aristomachus, Astynome, Eriphyle, Mecisteus, Metidice, and Pronax.

Notes

References 
Apollonius Rhodius, Argonautica translated by Robert Cooper Seaton (1853-1915), R. C. Loeb Classical Library Volume 001. London, William Heinemann Ltd, 1912. Online version at the Topos Text Project.
Apollonius Rhodius, Argonautica. George W. Mooney. London. Longmans, Green. 1912. Greek text available at the Perseus Digital Library.
Barthall, Edward E. Gods and Goddesses of Ancient Greece. University of Miami Press, 1971, pp. 105–106.
Gaius Julius Hyginus, Fabulae from The Myths of Hyginus translated and edited by Mary Grant. University of Kansas Publications in Humanistic Studies. Online version at the Topos Text Project.
Pausanias, Description of Greece with an English Translation by W.H.S. Jones, Litt.D., and H.A. Ormerod, M.A., in 4 Volumes. Cambridge, MA, Harvard University Press; London, William Heinemann Ltd. 1918. . Online version at the Perseus Digital Library
Pausanias, Graeciae Descriptio. 3 vols. Leipzig, Teubner. 1903.  Greek text available at the Perseus Digital Library.
Pindar, Odes translated by Diane Arnson Svarlien. 1990. Online version at the Perseus Digital Library.
Pindar, The Odes of Pindar including the Principal Fragments with an Introduction and an English Translation by Sir John Sandys, Litt.D., FBA. Cambridge, MA., Harvard University Press; London, William Heinemann Ltd. 1937. Greek text available at the Perseus Digital Library.
Pseudo-Apollodorus, The Library with an English Translation by Sir James George Frazer, F.B.A., F.R.S. in 2 Volumes, Cambridge, MA, Harvard University Press; London, William Heinemann Ltd. 1921. . Online version at the Perseus Digital Library. Greek text available from the same website.
Smith, Willam. Dictionary of Greek and Roman Biography and Mythology, v. 3, page 971

Argonauts
Kings of Argos
Kings in Greek mythology
Demigods in classical mythology
Characters in the Argonautica

Argive characters in Greek mythology